Following is a list of Indian women artists were born in India and or have a strong association with India.

A 

 Dhruvi Acharya, visual artist
 Iloosh Ahluwalia (b. 1970s), painter
 V. Anamika, contemporary artist

B 

 Bhuri Bai (b. 1968), artist
 Lado Bai, Bhil tribal artist
 Uma Bardhan (b.1945), painter
 Atasi Barua (1921–2016), painter
 Madhuri Bhaduri (b. 1958), painter
 Dimpy Bhalotia (1987), street photographer
 Pamella Bordes, photographer
 Vasundhara Tewari Broota (b. 1955), painter
 Maya Burman (b. 1971), ink and watercolour painter, based in France

C 

 Shanthi Chandrasekar, visual artist
 Anju Chaudhuri (b.1944), artist
 Manimala Chitrakar, Bengal patua artist

D 

 Prafulla Dahanukar (1934–2014), painter
 Bharti Dayal (b.1961), painter
 Baua Devi, Mithila painter
 Pratima Devi (painter) (1893–1969), painter, dance teacher
 Anita Dube (1958), contemporary artist

G 

 Opashona Ghosh, illustrator
 Sheela Gowda (b. 1957)

H 

 Saba Hasan (b. 1962), contemporary artist

K 

 Latika Katt (b.1948), sculptor
 Renuka Kesaramadu, painter
 Bharti Kher (b. 1969), painter, sculptor and installation artist
 Saadiya Kochar, (b. 1979), photographer

L 

 Lalitha Lajmi (b.1932), painter
 Srimati Lal (1959-2019), painter

M 

 Nalini Malani (b.1946), painter, video and installation artist
 Divya Mehra (b. 1981), multidisciplinary artist
 Rooma Mehra (b. 1967), painter, sculptor and poet
 Bhavna Mehta (b. 1968), paper cut artist
 Anjolie Ela Menon (b. 1940), painter and muralist
 Mrinalini Mukherjee (1949-2015), sculptor

N 

 Kota Neelima, painter
 Mubarack Nissa (born 1981), contemporary artist and curator

O 

 Kuzana Ogg (b. 1971), painter

P 

 Gogi Saroj Pal (b. 1945), painter, sculptor, printmaker, installation
 Ketaki Pimpalkhare (b. 1977), painter
 Pilloo Pochkhanawala (1923–1986), sculptor
 B. Prabha (1933–2001), painter

Q

R 

 Gargi Raina (b. 1961), painter
 Chitra Ramanathan, Indian American abstract painter
 Rathika Ramasamy, wildlife photographer

S 

 Tara Sabharwal (b.1957), painter
 Nelly Sethna (1932–1992), textile artist
 Tejal Shah (born 1979), multidisciplinary contemporary artist
 Nilima Sheikh (b. 1945) visual artist
 Amrita Sher-Gil (1913–1941), painter
 Arpita Singh (1937), painter
 Dayanita Singh (b. 1961), photographer
 Emelina Soares, artist and art historian
 Y.G. Srimati (1926–2007), painter
 Karuna Sukka (b. 1980), printmaker
 Surekha, video artist
 Kruttika Susarla, comic book writer and illustrator

T 

 Jaya Thyagarajan (1956–2015), painter

U 

 Hema Upadhyay (1972–2015), photographer and installation artist

V 

 Geeta Vadhera, contemporary artist
 Rukmini Varma (b.1940), artist
 Vinita Vasu, visual artist and designer
 Durga Bai Vyom (b. 1973)

See also
 List of Indian artists

References

Women
Indian artists
Artists
Artists